Events from the year 1545 in Ireland.

Incumbent
Monarch: Henry VIII

Events
September – the English Royal Mint issues debased coinage for Ireland.
November 6 – Redmond O'Gallagher is appointed Bishop of Killala by Pope Paul III.

Births
 Eleanor Butler, Countess of Desmond
 Richard Tyrrell (d.1632), a commander of rebel Irish forces in the Irish Nine Years War.
 Murtogh O'Brien, an Anglican bishop of Killaloe, in County Clare.

Deaths
Domhnall Dubh, Scottish nobleman (b. late 15th century).

References

 
1540s in Ireland
Ireland
Years of the 16th century in Ireland